The 1934 Tour de Hongrie was the ninth edition of the Tour de Hongrie cycle race and was held from 26 to 30 June 1934. The race started and finished in Budapest. The race was won by Károly Szenes.

Route

General classification

References

1934
Tour de Hongrie
Tour de Hongrie